is a river in Hokkaidō, Japan. It is the namesake of Imperial Japanese Navy cruiser Yūbari.

Rivers of Hokkaido
Rivers of Japan